The 1927 Drake Bulldogs football team was an American football team that represented Drake University as a member of the Missouri Valley Conference (MVC) during the 1927 college football season. In their seventh season under head coach Ossie Solem, the Bulldogs compiled a 3–6 record (1–2 against MVC opponents), finished in ninth place out of ten teams in the MVC, and were outscored by a total of 158 to 89.

Schedule

References

Drake
Drake Bulldogs football seasons
Drake Bulldogs football